Three Rivers High School is a high school in Three Rivers, Michigan, United States. It is operated by Three Rivers Community Schools.

Demographics 
The demographic breakdown of the 680 students enrolled in 2018-19 was:

 Male - 50.4%
 Female - 49.6%
 Native American - 0.3%
 Asian - 1.2%
 Black - 5.9%
 Hispanic - 6.8%
 Hawaiian/Pacific Islander - 0.3%
 White - 77.9%
 Multiracial - 7.6%

In addition, 46.9% of students were eligible for reduced-price or free lunch.

Athletics
The schools teams are nicknamed the Wildcats. They compete in the Wolverine Conference.  They won a state title in football in 2003.  Three Rivers' rivals are Gull Lake High School, Vicksburg High School, and Sturgis High School.

References

External links

Public high schools in Michigan
Schools in St. Joseph County, Michigan